Shur Kal (also Romanized as Shūr Kāl; also known as Kāl Shūr Şedāqat) is a village in Takab Rural District, in the Central District of Dargaz County, Razavi Khorasan Province, Iran. At the 2006 census, its population was 169, in 36 families.

References 

Populated places in Dargaz County